Robert James Naso (born September 11, 1937) is an American former college football  coach. From 1961 to 1967 he was defensive line coach at Rutgers, then was defensive coordinator from 1968 to 1979.1967 Rutgers media guide, p. 21979 Rutgers media guide, p. 6 In 1976, while Naso worked as defensive coordinator, the Scarlet Knights went 11–0 and his unit placed first nationwide in total, rushing and scoring defense. After spending two decades with his alma mater, where he also played football and lacrosse, Naso moved on to become the head football coach at Columbia University. He was fired after five seasons during which time his teams compiled a 4–43–2 record, including a 1984 season that was Columbia's first winless season since 1943.

Naso has been inducted into the Rutgers University, Long Island Metropolitan Lacrosse, and New Jersey Lacrosse Halls of Fame.

Head coaching record

References

1937 births
Living people
American lacrosse players
Columbia Lions football coaches
Rutgers Scarlet Knights football players
Rutgers Scarlet Knights football coaches
Rutgers Scarlet Knights men's lacrosse players